A slope-former is a unit of bedrock which is less resistant to erosion than overlying or underlying units and consequently results in outcrops with low relative slope angles.  It may be contrasted with cliff-former.  Typical slope forming lithologies include shales, and limestones in humid environments.

Geomorphology
Erosion landforms